Evelyne Tschopp (born 19 June 1991) is a Swiss judoka.

She competed at the 2016 Summer Olympics in Rio de Janeiro, in the women's 52 kg.

In 2020, she competed in the women's 52 kg event at the 2020 European Judo Championships held in Prague, Czech Republic.

References

External links
 
 
 
 

1991 births
Living people
Swiss female judoka
Olympic judoka of Switzerland
Judoka at the 2016 Summer Olympics
Universiade medalists in judo
Universiade bronze medalists for Switzerland
European Games competitors for Switzerland
Judoka at the 2015 European Games
Medalists at the 2015 Summer Universiade
Sportspeople from Basel-Landschaft
21st-century Swiss women